Moses Monweal McCormick (March 12, 1981 – March 4, 2021), also known as Laoshu (from) or Laoshu505000, was an American language educator, polyglot, and YouTuber.

Language learning
McCormick gained popularity by speaking several languages with native speakers that he met in public places, and uploading the videos on his YouTube channel. He called this activity leveling up.

McCormick taught language lessons remotely over the Internet, over time developing his own language learning method, which he called FLR (Foreign Language Roadrunning). According to his YouTube biography, "When I first began language learning 20 years ago, I noticed that most language books and classes did not teach students how to prepare for real world conversations. In an attempt to solve this issue, I developed my own method, The FLR Method."

The foreign language in which McCormick was most fluent was Mandarin Chinese. He also spoke around twenty languages at a basic conversational level, including Japanese, Vietnamese, Cantonese, Korean, Somali, Spanish, and Swahili.

Death
McCormick died on March 4, 2021, in Phoenix, Arizona, from heart complications.

References

1981 births
2021 deaths
20th-century African-American people
21st-century African-American writers
African-American bloggers
American bloggers
American YouTubers
Ohio State University alumni
People from Akron, Ohio